Steffenberg is a municipality in Marburg-Biedenkopf district in Hesse, Germany.

Geography

Location
Steffenberg lies at the southern foothills of the Rothaargebirge between the towns of Dillenburg (20 km) and Marburg (35 km).

Neighbouring communities
Steffenberg borders in the north on the community of Breidenbach, in the east on the community of Dautphetal, in the south on the communities of Bad Endbach and Angelburg (all in Marburg-Biedenkopf), and in the west on the community of Eschenburg (Lahn-Dill-Kreis).

Divisions
The community consists of the following six centres:
Niedereisenhausen
Oberhörlen
Quotshausen
Steinperf
Obereisenhausen
Niederhörlen

History
On 1 April 1972, the formerly independent communities of  Niedereisenhausen, Obereisenhausen, Niederhörlen and Oberhörlen joined together of their own free will into the community of Steffenberg. On 1 July 1974, the communities of Steinperf and Quotshausen were amalgamated by state law with Steffenberg to form the current greater community.

Politics

Gemeinderat

These are the results of the municipal election held on 26 March 2006:

Coat of arms
The civic coat of arms might be described thus: In Or a low fess wavy azure; above, a bear statant sable.

The arms are a visual representation of the river Perf, which flows through the community, and whose name means as much as "bear water".

Partnerships
  Lüsen, South Tyrol, Italy
  Környe, Hungary

References

Marburg-Biedenkopf
Rothaar Mountains